Giorgi Kochorashvili (born 29 June 1999) is a Georgian professional footballer who plays as a central midfielder for Spanish club CD Castellón, on loan from Levante UD.

Club career
Born in Tbilisi, Kochorashvili played youth football for FC Saburtalo Tbilisi. He made his first team debut on 23 July 2017, playing the last 16 minutes in a 1–2 home loss against FC Torpedo Kutaisi.

In August 2017, Kochorashvili was loaned to Girona FC for two years, and was assigned to the youth setup. On 26 June of the following year, after finishing his formation, he was assigned to the farm team in Segunda División B.

On 19 July 2019, after Girona's offer was rejected by Saburtalo, Kochorashvili signed a three-year contract with Levante UD, being immediately assigned to the reserves also in the third division. He made his first team – and La Liga – debut on 12 July of the following year, coming on as a late substitute for Rubén Rochina in a 1–2 home loss against Athletic Bilbao.

On 30 August 2022, Kochorashvili was loaned to Primera Federación side CD Castellón for the season.

International career
Kochorashvili represented Georgia at under-19 and under-21 levels.

References

External links

1999 births
Living people
Footballers from Tbilisi
Footballers from Georgia (country)
Association football midfielders
Erovnuli Liga players
FC Saburtalo Tbilisi players
La Liga players
Primera Federación players
Segunda División B players
Segunda Federación players
CF Peralada players
Atlético Levante UD players
Levante UD footballers
CD Castellón footballers
Georgia (country) youth international footballers
Georgia (country) under-21 international footballers
Expatriate footballers from Georgia (country)
Expatriate sportspeople from Georgia (country) in Spain
Expatriate footballers in Spain